Andrew Murray Burnham (born 7 January 1970) is a British politician who has served as Mayor of Greater Manchester since 2017. He served in Gordon Brown's Cabinet as Chief Secretary to the Treasury from 2007 to 2008, Culture Secretary from 2008 to 2009 and Health Secretary from 2009 to 2010. A member of the Labour Party, he served as Shadow Home Secretary from 2015 to 2016 and was Member of Parliament (MP) for Leigh from 2001 to 2017.

Born in the Old Roan area of Aintree, Burnham was educated at St Aelred's Catholic High School in Newton-le-Willows and graduated with a degree in English from Fitzwilliam College, Cambridge. He worked as a researcher for Tessa Jowell from 1994 to 1997, then worked for the NHS Confederation in 1997 and as an administrator for the Football Task Force in 1998. He was a special adviser to Culture Secretary Chris Smith from 1998 to 2001. Following  the retirement of Lawrence Cunliffe, the Labour MP for Leigh, Burnham was elected to succeed him in 2001.

He served as a Parliamentary Private Secretary from 2003 to 2005. He was promoted by Prime Minister Tony Blair to serve in his Government after the 2005 election as Under-Secretary of State for the Home Department. In 2006, Burnham was reshuffled to become Minister of State for Health. When Gordon Brown became Prime Minister in 2007, Burnham was promoted to the Cabinet as Chief Secretary to the Treasury, a position he held until 2008, when he became Secretary of State for Culture, Media and Sport. In 2009, he was promoted again to become Secretary of State for Health. In that role, he opposed further privatisation of National Health Service services and launched an independent inquiry into the Stafford Hospital scandal. Following the Labour Party's defeat in the 2010 general election, Burnham was a candidate in the 2010 Labour leadership election, coming fourth out of five candidates. The contest was won by Ed Miliband. Burnham served as Shadow Secretary of State for Health until late 2010, when he was moved by Miliband to become Shadow Secretary of State for Education. He held that role for a year, then returning to the role of Shadow Health Secretary.

Following Ed Miliband's resignation as Labour leader due to the 2015 general election defeat, Burnham launched his campaign to succeed Miliband in the resulting September 2015 leadership election. He finished a distant second behind Jeremy Corbyn, after which he accepted a role in Corbyn's Shadow Cabinet as Shadow Home Secretary. After being selected as Labour's candidate for the new Greater Manchester Mayoralty, Burnham stood down as Shadow Home Secretary in 2016 and an MP at the 2017 general election. Burnham won the 2017 mayoral election, and was re-elected in the delayed election held in May 2021. For his role of securing more money for local Northern communities during the COVID-19 pandemic, he was dubbed the "King of the North" by the media.

Early life and education
Andrew Murray Burnham was born on 7 January 1970 in Aintree, Lancashire (now part of Liverpool City Region, Merseyside). His father, Kenneth Roy Burnham, was a telephone engineer and his mother, Eileen Mary Burnham, was a receptionist. He was brought up in Culcheth and educated at St Lewis Catholic Primary School and St Aelred's Roman Catholic High School, in Newton le Willows, St Helens. He studied English at Fitzwilliam College, Cambridge.

Early political career
Burnham joined the Labour Party when he was 15. From 1994 until the 1997 general election he was a researcher for Tessa Jowell. He joined the Transport and General Workers' Union in 1995. Following the 1997 election, he was a parliamentary officer for the NHS Confederation from August to December 1997, before taking up the post as an administrator with the Football Task Force for a year.

In 1998, he became a special adviser to the Secretary of State for Culture, Media and Sport, Chris Smith, a position he remained in until he was elected to the House of Commons in 2001.

Member of Parliament
Following the retirement of Lawrence Cunliffe, Burnham successfully applied to be the parliamentary candidate for Leigh in Greater Manchester, then a safe Labour seat. At the 2001 election he was elected with a majority of 16,362, and gave his maiden speech in the House of Commons on 4 July 2001.

Following his election to Parliament, Burnham was a member of the Health Select Committee from 2001 until 2003, when he was appointed Parliamentary Private Secretary (PPS) to the Home Secretary David Blunkett. Following  Blunkett's first resignation in 2004, he became PPS to the education secretary Ruth Kelly. Burnham voted for the Iraq War, and consistently voted against holding an inquiry into the war.

In Government (2005–2010)
Burnham was promoted to serve in the Government following the 2005 election as a Parliamentary Under Secretary of State, with responsibility for implementing the Identity Cards Act 2006. In the government reshuffle of 5 May 2006, he was moved from the Home Office and promoted to Minister of State for Delivery and Reform at the Department of Health. In Gordon Brown's first cabinet, announced on 28 June 2007, Burnham was appointed Chief Secretary to the Treasury, a position he held until 2008. During his time at the Treasury, he helped write the 2007 Comprehensive Spending Review.

Brown Cabinet (2008–2010)
In a re-shuffle in January 2008, Burnham was promoted to the position of Secretary of State for Culture, Media and Sport, replacing James Purnell. In June 2008, he apologised to the director of pressure group Liberty, Shami Chakrabarti, after she threatened to sue him for libel for smearing her reputation in an article Burnham had written for Progress magazine.

In late 2008, Burnham announced government plans to tighten controls on internet content in order to "even up" what he described as an imbalance with TV regulations. The announcement was followed by a speech to the music industry's lobbying group, UK Music, in which he announced "a time that calls for partnership between Government and the music business as a whole: one with rewards for both of us; one with rewards for society as a whole. (...) My job – Government's job – is to preserve the value in the system."

In April 2009 after being heckled at the 20th anniversary of the Hillsborough disaster Burnham used the next day's cabinet meeting in Downing Street to ask then prime minister Gordon Brown if he could raise the issue of Hillsborough in Parliament, and Brown agreed. The eventual result was the second Hillsborough inquiry. In 2014 when Burnham spoke at the 25th anniversary of the Hillsborough disaster he was cheered and applauded by the crowd.

Burnham was again promoted becoming Secretary of State for Health in June 2009. He held the post until the Labour government resigned after the 2010 general election. In July 2009, a month after he became health secretary, Burnham launched an independent inquiry chaired by the QC Robert Francis into unusually high mortality rates at Stafford Hospital. The inquiry found systematic failures at the hospital, and was critical of care provided by the Mid Staffordshire NHS Foundation Trust. A wider public inquiry, also led by Robert Francis, was launched in 2010 by his successor as health secretary, Andrew Lansley. It found serious failings at the hospital but concluded it would be "misleading" to link those failings to a particular number of deaths. After leaving office, reports claimed that Burnham and his predecessor as health secretary, Alan Johnson, had rejected 81 requests for an inquiry sitting in public to examine the high rate of deaths at Stafford hospital. According to The Daily Telegraph, after initial concerns were raised about links between mortality rates and standards of care in 2005, there were up to 2,800 more deaths than expected across 14 NHS trusts highlighted as having unusually high death rates. These figures for deaths were however discredited. A report, the Keogh Review, following an investigation into the 14 NHS trusts by Bruce Keogh, described the use of such statistical measures as "clinically meaningless and academically reckless".

In Opposition (2010–2017)

First leadership campaign (2010)
Burnham became Shadow Secretary of State for Health after May 2010 following the defeat of Gordon Brown's government. Following Brown's resignation as leader of the Labour Party, Burnham declared his intention to stand in the subsequent leadership contest. He launched his leadership campaign in his Leigh constituency on 26 May. Burnham stood on his philosophy of "aspirational socialism", aligning himself with Intern Aware's campaign to end unpaid internships. He made policy commitments including the creation of a national care service and replacing inheritance tax with a land value tax. Burnham finished fourth, eliminated on the second ballot with 10.4% of the vote. The leadership contest was won by Ed Miliband.

Miliband Shadow Cabinet (2010–2015)
In October 2010, Burnham was appointed Shadow Secretary of State for Education and election co-ordinator for the Labour Party. As shadow education secretary, Burnham opposed the coalition government's plans for "free schools". He argued for moving the education system back towards a comprehensive system.

A year later, he was appointed to the role of Shadow Secretary of State for Health, which he held until 2015.

In July 2013 The Daily Telegraph reported that Burnham's staff had edited his Wikipedia page to remove criticisms of his handling of the Stafford Hospital scandal. Burnham's office claimed they had removed false statements that had been drawn to their attention.

Second leadership campaign (2015)

On 13 May 2015, Burnham announced that he would stand to replace Ed Miliband in the 2015 leadership election. He stressed the need to unite the party and country and "rediscover the beating heart of Labour."

He attracted press criticism for claiming £17,000 in expenses to rent a London flat, despite owning another within walking distance of the House of Commons. A spokesperson for Burnham said that renting out the original flat was necessary to "cover his costs" as parliamentary rule changes meant he was no longer able to claim for mortgage interest expenses. Burnham was criticised for jokingly saying that Labour should have a woman leader "when the time is right", with the New Statesman saying that he had "tripped over his mouth again". He also said that he would resign from the Shadow Cabinet if Labour supported leaving NATO, something which Jeremy Corbyn had talked about. Burnham was criticised for refusing to talk to "The Sun" newspaper when it emerged he had been interviewed by "The Sun" in his previous run for the Labour leadership, and had been photographed in the back of a cab for the newspaper. Burnham abstained on the government's welfare bill, despite having previously described the legislation as "unsupportable".

Burnham came second to Jeremy Corbyn in the election, with 19% of the vote in the first round, compared to 59% for Corbyn.

Corbyn Shadow Cabinet (2015–2017)

In September 2015, Burnham accepted an appointment as shadow home secretary in the first Shadow Cabinet of Jeremy Corbyn and remained in the role after the 2016 reshuffle.
Burnham opposes the Prevent counter-terrorism strategy; appearing in 2016 alongside the anti-Prevent organisation MEND, Burnham said: "The Prevent duty to report extremist behaviour is today's equivalent of internment in Northern Ireland."

On 27 April 2016, the day after the Hillsborough inquest verdict that found the 96 Hillsborough deaths had occurred as a result of unlawful killing, Burnham made a speech to the House of Commons calling for those responsible to be held to account. Condemning South Yorkshire Police, which had instigated a cover-up in the aftermath of the tragedy, he described the force as being "rotten to the core" while suggesting that the cover-up had been "advanced in the committee rooms of this House and in the press rooms of 10 Downing Street". The eleven-minute statement drew applause from MPs, a response that is generally against convention at Westminster.

On 25 April 2017, as his final act in Parliament, he delivered an adjournment debate that lasted over an hour on the Contaminated Blood Scandal. Burnham used the debate to present a raft of evidence stating "this scandal amounts to a criminal cover-up on an industrial scale" and that "these are criminal acts". He said that if the Government did not set up an Investigation into the scandal that he would refer his evidence to the police.

Mayor of Greater Manchester (2017–present)

Candidacy and election
On 5 May 2016, a spokesperson for Burnham confirmed that he had been approached by party officials in Greater Manchester, asking him to consider resigning from the Shadow Cabinet of Jeremy Corbyn in order to run in the upcoming mayoral election in 2017. On 18 May 2016, he confirmed that he was running for Mayor. Burnham was selected as the Labour candidate in August 2016. In September 2016, Burnham said that he would resign as Shadow Home Secretary once a replacement had been found, in order to concentrate on his mayoral bid. He was succeeded by Diane Abbott in October. Burnham said, if elected as Greater Manchester's mayor, he would resign his seat as the member of parliament for Leigh. However, the 2017 general election was declared a fortnight before the mayoral election; Burnham did not stand as a candidate.

Burnham was elected to the new role of mayor of Greater Manchester on 5 May 2017. Upon taking office, he became entitled to the style of Mayor. He received 63% of the vote, winning majorities in all ten of Greater Manchester's boroughs. In his mayoral victory speech he said that "[politics] has been too London-centric for too long … Greater Manchester is going to take control. We are going to change politics and make it work better for people."

In the election of 6 May 2021, Burnham was re-elected as mayor, with 67% of the vote on a turnout of 34.7%.

Mayoralty
The issue of homelessness in Greater Manchester was a major focus of Burnham's mayoral campaign. He pledged to donate 15% of his mayoral salary to charities tackling homelessness if elected. After his election he outlined his plan to launch a "homelessness fund", with money going to homeless charities and mental health and rehabilitation services. He pledged to end rough sleeping in Greater Manchester by 2020, however, in November 2019 he admitted he would miss his target.

Public transport
In 2020, Burnham signed off on a new £10 yearly charge for pensioners who wished to continue to use their TFGM travel passes on the regions trains and trams. The charge is said to help fund a London-style bus system. Pensioners in London get free travel on all public transport in London from the age of 60, while Burnham kept the Manchester system linked to the much later state pension age.

Burnham pledged to bring Manchester's bus network back into public ownership by 2025. The Mayor and Authority's plans were legally challenged by bus operators Stagecoach Group and Rotala, but in March 2022 the Mayor and Authority won the case at the High Court. Media analysts commented that the ruling could pave the way for other city regions in England to regulate bus services that had been privatised since the 1980s. Capped fares of £2 for adult single fares were introduced in September 2022, prior to the bus network becoming regulated.

COVID-19 pandemic 
In March 2020, Burnham called for clearer advice on slowing the spread of Coronavirus, citing his previous experience as health secretary during the 2009 swine flu pandemic. He welcomed the additional measures implemented across Greater Manchester and Lancashire by Secretary of State for Health and Social Care Matt Hancock in July during the COVID-19 pandemic, in the knowledge that (at the time) some areas across North West England had lower infection rates than the rest of the country. On 15 October 2020 Burnham, along with other North West leaders, backed away from government talks to place Greater Manchester in tier 3 – the most restrictive level – of a new three-tier categorisation. He cited the grants system for businesses and 60% furlough scheme for employees as insufficient, saying they would push people into poverty and destitution which would outweigh the impact of the virus if mitigated correctly. Many of the concerns such as the impact on businesses and employees were shared by local Conservative MPs in Greater Manchester and surrounding areas. For his role of securing more money for local Northern communities during the COVID-19 pandemic, he was dubbed the "King of the North" by the media. However he did not secure as much extra money as he had wanted, being forced to lower his request for £90 million to £65 million.

Political views
Burnham has said that he joined the Labour Party at the age of 15 after having been "radicalised" by the UK miners' strike (1984–85). Ideologically, he identifies as a socialist. In his 2010 leadership bid Burnham emphasised his philosophy of "aspirational socialism", which he described as redistributive, collectivist and internationalist. He is a strong opponent of nationalism, which he called as an "ugly brand of politics". Burnham's politics have been described as soft left by a number of media outlets, including the Financial Times, the New Statesman, and LabourList. Iain Martin in The Times described Burnham as a "former Blairite" and associated with New Labour.

Burnham supports the use of all-women shortlists for parliamentary candidate selections. He is a supporter of LGBT rights and voted in favour of same-sex marriage in 2013. In an interview in The Daily Telegraph in October 2007, Burnham said: "I think it's better when children are in a home where their parents are married" and "it's not wrong that the tax system should recognise commitment and marriage", creating controversy because his views replicated the policies of the Conservative Party.

In his 2015 leadership bid, Burnham pledged to commit Labour to "a policy of progressive renationalisation of the railway system". Burnham also favours a universal graduate tax to replace student tuition fees, and voted against the most recent increase in fees. He has advocated a National Care Service, integrating care services into the National Health Service. Burnham's key economic policies in his leadership bid included a new levy to fund social care, extending the higher minimum wage to all ages (it currently only applies to those over 25), and banning zero-hour contracts. Burnham described the mansion tax proposed by Ed Miliband as "the politics of envy", saying he knew it would lose votes when his mother phoned and told him it represented a return to the 1970s.

Burnham is a strong supporter of devolving power and, in his 2015 leadership campaign, criticised the "Westminster Bubble", the London-centric focus in British politics and perceived detachment from life outside Westminster. However, some opponents and political commentators accused him of being a part of the same bubble that he criticises. He views devolution of powers to Greater Manchester (including an elected mayor) as an opportunity for urban regeneration. He also called for a focus on Northern identity. After he was elected as Mayor of Greater Manchester, he described the new powers for northern cities as "the dawn of a new era". Burnham feels the government does not invest enough money in the North of England, saying: "Almost five years after the government promised us a northern powerhouse, we learn that public spending in the north has fallen while rising in the south. This has got to stop and it is time that the north came to the front of the queue for public investment".

Burnham voted for Keir Starmer, who went on to win, in the 2020 Labour Party leadership election, saying in an interview with The Guardian that "Keir is a brilliant man. The fact he was a former DPP, and came to work in my shadow Home Office team with no airs and graces says a lot about Keir Starmer."

Burnham is a supporter of an elected House of Lords and for switching elections to the House of Commons to a form of proportional representation.

Personal life
Burnham has a brother, Nick, who is the principal of Cardinal Newman College, Preston. Burnham married Marie-France van Heel, who is Dutch, in 2000, having been in a relationship since university. The couple have a son and two daughters. Burnham was brought up as a Roman Catholic. In the 2015 leadership contest he praised Pope Francis, but urged him to promote a progressive stance on gay rights. In a newspaper interview during the contest he stated that he had been repeatedly at odds with the Catholic Church all the time that he had been an MP and that this had resulted in strained personal relationships.

Burnham was the honorary chairman of Leigh Centurions for a short time and is now an honorary vice-president. Burnham was a talented junior cricketer (playing for Lancashire CCC Juniors) and keen footballer, and competed at both sports for his college. He has played for Labour's "Demon Eyes" football team and is a lifelong fan of Premier League football club Everton. In July 2003, Burnham played for Conference club Leigh RMI in a pre-season friendly against Everton. He came on as an 88th minute substitute for Neil Robinson in the 1–1 draw at Hilton Park.

In December 2017 it was announced that Burnham would succeed Dean Andrew as president of the Rugby Football League in July 2018. Burnham was replaced by Tony Adams as president of the league in the summer of 2019.

In media
Burnham was portrayed by Matthew McNulty in Anne (2022), an ITV miniseries about the Hillsborough disaster.

References

External links 

 

Audio clips
Interview with GMR after 2005 election BBC Manchester

Video clips
Delivering 18 week NHS target YouTube

|-

|-

|-

|-

|-

|-

|-

|-

 
1970 births
Alumni of Fitzwilliam College, Cambridge
British special advisers
British socialists
British feminists
Male feminists
English socialist feminists
English Roman Catholics
Labour Party (UK) MPs for English constituencies
Labour Friends of Israel
Living people
Members of the Privy Council of the United Kingdom
People from Aintree
Politicians from Liverpool
Secretaries of State for Health (UK)
UK MPs 2001–2005
UK MPs 2005–2010
UK MPs 2010–2015
UK MPs 2015–2017
Members of the Parliament of the United Kingdom for Leigh
Shadow Secretaries of State for Health
Chief Secretaries to the Treasury
Members of the Greater Manchester Combined Authority
Labour Party (UK) mayors
Mayors of places in Greater Manchester